Beachley Classic is an event on the ASP World Surfing Tour. The event is held every year at Manly Beach or Dee Why in Sydney and has the richest prize money in Women's surfing.

Results

See also
Layne Beachley
Women's surfing in Australia

References

World Surf League
Surfing competitions in Australia
Recurring sporting events established in 2006
Sports competitions in Sydney
Manly, New South Wales
Women's surfing